Turchetta is an Italian surname. Notable people with the surname include:

Alessandro Turchetta (born 1982), Italian footballer
Gianluca Turchetta (born 1991), Italian footballer

Italian-language surnames